Junior Lake may refer to:

Junior Lake (Vancouver Island), a lake located on Vancouver Island
Junior Lake (baseball) (born 1990), Dominican Republic baseball player

See also
 Junior (disambiguation)
 Lake (disambiguation)